is a Japanese football player. He currently plays for Montedio Yamagata in the J2 League

Club statistics
Last updated 26 July 2022.

Reserves performance

Honors

Gamba Osaka

J. League Division 1 - 2014
J. League Division 2 - 2013
Emperor's Cup - 2014
J. League Cup - 2014

References

External links
Profile at Tochigi SC

1990 births
Living people
Kansai University alumni
Association football people from Hiroshima Prefecture
Japanese footballers
J1 League players
J2 League players
J3 League players
Gamba Osaka players
Gamba Osaka U-23 players
Ehime FC players
Tochigi SC players
Montedio Yamagata players
Association football midfielders